Kadamba is a 1983 film, directed by P. N. Menon and produced by P. V. George. The film stars Prakash, Jayanthi, Sathaar and Achankunju in the lead roles. The film has musical score by K. Raghavan.

Plot
Janu is brought up by her father after the sudden death of her mother. Problems start brewing in her life when her father searches for a perfect groom, unaware that she is in love with someone else.

Cast
 Jayanthi as Janu 
 Prakash 
 Achankunju as Velu, janu's father
 Balan K. Nair as Keshavan
 Sathaar as Kunjiraman 
 Bhaskara Kuruppu

Soundtrack
The music was composed by K. Raghavan and the lyrics were written by Bichu Thirumala and Thikkodiyan.

References

External links
 

1983 films
1980s Malayalam-language films
Films directed by P. N. Menon (director)